Epiblema sugii is a species of moth of the family Tortricidae. It is found in China (Xinjiang) and Japan.

References

Moths described in 1976
Eucosmini